The Australian Archives of the Dance (also known as the Australian Dance Archives) is Australia’s oldest specialist dance archive. Established by The Australian Ballet in 1972, the Archive was transferred to the Performing Arts Collection of the Melbourne Arts Centre in 1998.

Collection

The Archives include over 50,000 items covering the breadth of Australia’s dance history, with particular reference to the main Melbourne-based ballet companies:  the Borovansky Ballet, the Victorian Ballet Guild / Ballet Victoria, the National Theatre Ballet and The Australian Ballet.  The Archives include costumes, costume elements, costume and set designs, lighting plans, props, business records, correspondence, photographs, albums, scrapbooks, programs, personality files, and newspaper clippings.

Material relating to The Australian Ballet within the Archives is largely in the form of personality and, to a lesser extent, performance photographs, programs, and scrapbooks. The personality photographs are notable for their extensive coverage of principal dancers (e.g. Garth Welch, Kathleen Gorham, Kathleen Geldard, Kelvin Coe) and guest dancers (e.g. Margot Fonteyn and Rudolf Nureyev) who performed with the major Australian ballet companies.

Formed Collections

The Archives include a number of subsidiary formed personality collections, donated by their creators, these include:

 the Peggy van Praagh Collection
 the Joyce Graeme Collection
 the Laurel Martyn Collection
 the Rex Smith Collection

Composite Collections

The Archives hold important composite collections built up from a number of donations relating to:

 the three Australian tours of Wassily de Basil’s Ballets Russes companies (1936-1940)
 the Australian tours of Anna Pavlova (1926, 1929)

External links
 Collections & Research, the Arts Centre, Melbourne

Archives in Australia
Dance in Australia